Langenhoe is a village in the Colchester district of Essex, England to the south of Colchester.  According to the 2001 census it had a population of 536, increasing to 572 at the 2011 Census.

The village church was once reputed to be amongst the most haunted buildings in Essex. This ancient church, which had been damaged in the Essex earthquake of 1884, was closed to worship in 1955 and demolished in 1963 after it was deemed structurally unsafe.

The name Langenhoe is from the Old English for ‘long hill-spur’.

References

External links
 Langenhoe in the Domesday Book

Villages in Essex
Borough of Colchester